George Gerard Sutton KC (17 June 1880 – 27 December 1955) was a South African judge and Judge President of the Cape Provincial Division of the Supreme Court.

Early life 
Sutton was born on the Farm, Klip River in the Swellendam district, the second son of the Reverend Joseph George Sutton and Catharina Benedicta Sutton (née Reitz). The Rev Sutton became the headmaster of Dale College in June 1890. George was educated at Dale College and also at the Manchester Grammar School. He then continued as a Scholar of Emmanuel College, Cambridge, and achieved a double first in the Law Tripos.

Career
After graduating in 1903, he was called to the Middle Temple, London in June 1903. Later in 1903 he returned to South Africa and started practice at the Cape Bar in October. In 1921 he took silk and was appointed a puisne judge at the Cape Provincial Division in February 1929. From September 1946 until he retired in May 1948, he was Judge-President of the Cape.

Personal life
Sutton married Agnes Gertrude Watermeyer on 29 December 1909 in Cape Town. Agnes was the sister of Ernest Frederick Watermeyer, who was Chief Justice of South Africa. George and Agnes had five children, three daughters and two sons.

References

1880 births
1955 deaths
South African judges
20th-century South African judges
Alumni of Emmanuel College, Cambridge
South African Queen's Counsel